Roger Rotherham was an English priest in the second half of the 15th century.

Rotherham was born in the West Riding of Yorkshire. He was Warden of King's Hall, Cambridge from 1473 to 1477; Archdeacon of Rochester from 1474 to 1475; and Archdeacon of Leicester from 1474 to 1478.

Notes

See also
 Diocese of Lincoln
 Diocese of Peterborough
 Diocese of Leicester
 Archdeacon of Leicester

People from the West Riding of Yorkshire (before 1974)
Archdeacons of Leicester
15th-century English people
Archdeacons of Rochester
Academics of the University of Cambridge